The motorsport industry is the range of engineering and service businesses that support the sporting discipline of motorsports.

In motorsports, a competitors' success is intimately linked with the performance of his or her equipment - in this case a vehicle. The role of engineering in delivering on-track success has led to the formation of a considerable global industry which supplies motorsport competitors with the equipment necessary to participate in the sport.

The industry
The motorsport industry designs, develops and manufactures prototypes including chassis, materials, electronics, engines, transmissions, brakes, telemetry and suspension components. The industry relies upon the skills of competitive engineers who, season after season, incrementally improve components to deliver identifiable advantage and ongoing success on the race track. Competitive Engineering is the centerpiece of these internationally-trading small businesses. Motorsport businesses have developed a unique ability to use sporting endeavour and entertainment as a catalyst for engineering and manufacturing advances - advances subsequently of real value to other High Performance Engineering (HPE) customer groups – Defence, Marine, Aerospace and Automotive.

The Motorsport Industry Association (MIA) 
The Motorsport Industry Association (MIA) is the world's leading trade association for the motorsport, performance engineering, services and tuning sectors. The MIA represents the specialised needs of this highly successful global industry as it undergoes continuing rapid development throughout the world.

In April 1994, leading personalities in British motorsport joined forces to form their own trade association - the MIA - with the aim of promoting one of the UK's most successful industries - motorsport. The original concept was proposed by Founder and original CEO, Brian Sims, with the first Executive Committee comprising Rob Baldock (Accenture); Dick Scammel (Cosworth);Tony Schulp (Haymarket); John Kirkpatrick (Jim Russell Racing Drivers School); Tony Panaro (Euro Northern Travel) and Tony Fletcher (Premier Fuels).

The MIA represents its members from motorsport, high performance engineering and tuning companies; race and rally teams; governing bodies; motorsport services; research organisations; race circuits; Universities and colleges - amongst many others. The MIA enjoys membership of the Confederation of British Industry (CBI), in turn providing members access to the UK's “Voice of Industry”.

References

Sport industry
Motorsport
Industries (economics)